Jan de Bont (born 22 October 1943) is a Dutch retired cinematographer, director and film producer. He is best known for directing the films Speed (1994) and Twister (1996). As a director of photography, de Bont also worked on numerous blockbusters and genre films, including Roar, Cujo, Flesh and Blood, Die Hard, The Hunt for Red October, and Basic Instinct.

Early life and career
De Bont was born to a Catholic family in Eindhoven, Netherlands, one of 17 children. His earliest works were made while studying at the Amsterdam Film Academy with Dutch avant-garde director Adriaan Ditvoorst. He first became known in the Netherlands as the cinematographer for the infamous 1971 film Blue Movie, followed by the 1973 film Turkish Delight (1973), directed by Paul Verhoeven, starring Rutger Hauer and Monique van de Ven. Since the early 1980s, he has worked frequently in Hollywood, often collaborating with directors including Verhoeven and John McTiernan.

While serving as cinematographer for the 1981 film Roar, de Bont experienced one of many on-set injuries during filming, when a lion lifted his scalp, requiring 220 stitches. After Roar, de Bont shot the 1983 horror film Cujo, an adaptation of the Stephen King novel of the same name.

In 1988, he was director of photography on the critically acclaimed action film Die Hard. The following year, de Bont shot the Ridley Scott-directed action thriller Black Rain.

Directing
De Bont made his directorial debut with the action thriller Speed in 1994, which was a sleeper hit. He followed this up with the even more successful Twister in 1996. His output since has had mixed commercial and critical success. In 1997, he returned to direct the sequel Speed 2: Cruise Control, which was a commercial and critical failure. In 1999, he oversaw the commercially successful but critically derided remake of The Haunting, which received five Razzie nominations, including Worst Picture. His most recent directorial outing was the 2003 action adventure film Lara Croft: Tomb Raider – The Cradle of Life, based on the video game series of the same name, and starring Angelina Jolie as the eponymous Lara Croft.

Unrealized Godzilla project
De Bont began pre-production on an American Godzilla film for a summer 1996 release, but quit at the end of 1994 when Sony Pictures Entertainment (Columbia Pictures and TriStar Pictures's parent company) refused to approve his budget request. He was eventually replaced by Roland Emmerich, who rewrote the script in addition to directing. While critically panned, Emmerich's Godzilla was moderately successful at the box-office.

Personal life
He was married to Dutch actress Monique van de Ven from 1973 to 1988. Monique starred in the 1973 film Turkish Delight, for which de Bont did the cinematography. De Bont has two children from his second marriage with Trish Reeves.

De Bont is an avid collector of photography, owning hundreds of photographic prints by famous and influential photographers.

Filmography

As cinematographer

See also
 1997 Golden Raspberry Awards

References

External links
 

1943 births
Dutch Roman Catholics
Dutch cinematographers
Dutch film directors
Dutch emigrants to the United States
People from Eindhoven
Living people
English-language film directors